Hinson Leung Cheuk Hin (born 25 November 1987) is a former Hong Kong professional football player who played as a midfielder.

Club career

South China
Leung was promoted from the youth team of South China in the 2008–09 season.

International career
Leung was included in Kim Pan-Gon's squad for the 2010 East Asian Football Championship qualifiers, which began in Kaohsiung, Taiwan, on Sunday 23 August 2009, when Leung was only 21 years old and only played a top class football match once. Leung admitted he was included in the squad only because he was a South China player. "It is a great honour for me to represent Hong Kong,' he said. 'But I know this would not have happened if I was not playing for South China."

Leung was graduated from St. Joseph's College, one of the most prestigious secondary school in Hong Kong, with a tremendous result of 4A2B in The Hong Kong Certificate of Education Examination (HKCEE). He was admitted by The Bachelor of Business Administration (BBA) programme of The Chinese University of Hong Kong in 2006, and was graduated in 2010.

Honour
Hong Kong
2009 East Asian Games Football Event: Gold

Career statistics

Club
As of 16 June 2011

International

Hong Kong
As of 7 January 2010

Hong Kong U-23
As of 10 December 2009

References

External links

 Hinson Leung at HKFA
 Player Information on southchinafc.com 

1987 births
Living people
Hong Kong footballers
South China AA players
TSW Pegasus FC players
Tai Chung FC players
Hong Kong First Division League players
Hong Kong international footballers
Association football midfielders